The AIR Awards of 2015 (or Carlton Dry Independent Music Awards of 2015) is the tenth annual Australian Independent Record Labels Association Music Awards (generally known as the AIR Awards) and was an award ceremony at The Meat Market, North Melbourne on 22 October 2015. The event was again sponsored by Australian liquor brand, Carlton Dry. The Carlton Dry Global Music Grant award was removed this year, after two previous appearances.

Courtney Barnett won Best Independent Artist and Best Independent Single for the second consecutive year.

Performers
Bad//Dreems 
Airling
Dead Letter Circus 
Harts and John Butler

Nominees and winners

AIR Awards
Winners are listed first and highlighted in boldface; other final nominees are listed alphabetically.

See also
Music of Australia

References

2015 in Australian music
2015 music awards
AIR Awards